There are 3500 newspapers being published in Azerbaijan. The vast majority of them are published in Azerbaijani. The remaining 130 are published in Russian (70), English (50) and other languages (Turkish, French, German, Arabic, Persian, Armenian, etc.).

Azerbaijani newspapers can be split into more serious-minded newspapers, usually referred to as broadsheets due to their large size, and sometimes known collectively as "the quality press".

Below is a list of newspapers published in Azerbaijan.

Newspapers

Daily newspapers

{| class="sortable wikitable"
! width="10%" | Title
! width="6%"  | Published
! width="15%" | Format
! width="2%"  | Est.
! width="20%" | Owner
! width="5%"  | Language
! width="23%" | Orientation
! width="23%" | Political party support in 2013 Presidential election
|-
| AzeriTimes.com || Daily || Broadsheet || 2008 || Ziya Ibrahim || English || Independent, Left-center || 
|-
| Crime and Criminal || Daily || Broadsheet || 2016 || Aqil Yusifov || Azerbaijani || New Azerbaijan Party ||
|-
| Adalat || Daily || Broadsheet || 1990 || Agil Abbas || Azerbaijani || Right-center || New Azerbaijan Party
|-
| Azadliq || Daily || Broadsheet || 1989 || Ganimat Zahid || Azerbaijani || Left-wing || National Council of Democratic Forces
|-
| Azerbaycan || Daily || Berliner || 1918 || Government of Azerbaijan || Azerbaijani || Right-wing || New Azerbaijan Party
|-
| Bakinskiy Rabochiy || Daily || Broadsheet || 1906 || Agabak Asgarov || Russian || Right-center || New Azerbaijan Party
|-
| Bizim Yol || Daily || Broadsheet || 2000 || Bahaddin Gaziyev || Azerbaijani || Left-center || 
|-
| Echo || Daily || Broadsheet || 2001 || Rauf Talishinsky || Russian || Liberal || 
|-
| Ekspress || Daily || Broadsheet || 1995 || Mushfig Safiyev || Azerbaijani || Left-center || 
|-
| Kaspi || Daily || Broadsheet || 1999 || Intellekt || Azerbaijani || Right-center || 
|-
| Khalg Gazeti || Daily || Broadsheet || 1919 || Mahal Ismayilogly || Azerbaijani || Right-wing|| New Azerbaijan Party
|-
| Khalg Cebhesi Gazeti || Daily || Broadsheet || 2001 || Elchin Mirzabeyli || Azerbaijani || Left-wing || National Council of Democratic Forces
|-
| Respublika || Daily || Broadsheet || 1990 || Government of Azerbaijan || Azerbaijani || Right-wing, populist || New Azerbaijan Party
|-
| Sherg || Daily || Broadsheet || 1996 || Akif Ashirli || Azerbaijani || Right-wing || 
|-
| Tezadlar || Daily || Broadsheet || 1993 || Asif Marzili || Azerbaijani || Right-wing || 
|-
| Üç nöqta || Daily || Broadsheet || 1998 || Khoshgadam Hidayatgizy || Azerbaijani || Right-wing ||
|-
| Yeni Musavat || Daily || Broadsheet || 1989 || Rauf Arifoglu || Azerbaijani || Left-wing, populist || National Council of Democratic Forces
|-
| Zaman || Daily || Broadsheet || 1991 || Fetullah Gulen || Azerbaijani || Left-center || 
|-
|}

Non-daily newspapers

{| class="sortable wikitable"
! width="10%" | Title
! width="6%"  | Published
! width="15%" | Format
! width="2%"  | Est.
! width="20%" | Owner
! width="5%"  | Language
! width="23%" | Orientation
! width="23%" | Political party support in 2013 Presidential election
|-
|-
| Azernews || Sunday || Berliner || 1997 || Fazil Abbasov || English || Centre-right || New Azerbaijan Party
|-
| Nedelya Jivaya Gazeta || Sunday || Berliner || 1997 || Unknown || Russian || Centre-right || New Azerbaijan Party
|-
|}

Local newspapers in Azerbaijan
Lankaran
Lankaran
Nakhchivan
Sharg Gapisi
Shaki
Shaki
Shakinin Sasi
Sumgayit
365 Gün

Specialist newspapers

Sport
Futbol+ – daily newspaper summarising the day's football news

Miscellaneous special interest
Ədəbiyyat qəzeti – monthly literary newspaper
Qoroskop – monthly newspaper aimed at horoscope followers
Tumurcuq – monthly newspaper for children

Freesheet newspapers in urban centres
Birja – weekly free newspaper of classified advertising

Defunct newspapers
Akinchi (1875–1877) - weekly
Bauer und Arbeiter (1924) - weekly
Çeşmə (1991–1995)- daily.
Dövran (1997–2000) - weekly.
Gündəlik Azərbaycan (2005–2007) - daily.
Istiglal (1932–1934) - weekly
Komanda (2008–2014) - daily newspaper summarising football news
Lenins Weg (1932–1936) - weekly
Müxalifət (1991–2007) - daily
Zerkalo (1990–2014) - daily

References

External links
Newspapers List of Azerbaijan

Further reading
 

Azerbaijan
Newspapers in Azerbaijan